The Sally McDonnell Barksdale Honors College (SMBHC) is the honors program at the University of Mississippi in the United States. It was founded in 1997 through an endowment from Jim and Sally Barksdale. The institute originally bore the name McDonnell-Barksdale Honors College but was renamed upon the death of Sally Barksdale in 2003.

The Dean of the SMBHC is Douglass Sullivan-González.

In 2005, Reader's Digest named the college  Best Honors College in its Best of America issue.

References

External links
Official SMBHC website

Barksdale Honors College
Public honors colleges